The Monthly Review, established in 1949, is an independent socialist magazine published monthly in New York City. The publication is the longest continuously published socialist magazine in the United States.

History

Establishment
Following the failure of the independent 1948 Presidential campaign of Henry A. Wallace, two former supporters of the Wallace effort met at the farm in New Hampshire where one of them was living. The two men were literary scholar and Christian socialist F.O. "Matty" Matthiessen and Marxist economist Paul Sweezy, who were former colleagues at Harvard University. Matthiessen came into an inheritance after his father died in an automobile accident in California and had no pressing need for the money. Matthiessen made the offer to Sweezy to underwrite "that magazine [Sweezy] and Leo Huberman were always talking about," committing the sum of $5,000 per year for three years. Matthiessen's funds made the launch of Monthly Review possible, although the amount of the seed money was reduced to $4,000 per year in the second and third years by the executors of Matthiessen's estate following his suicide in 1950.

Although Matthiessen was the financial angel of the new publication, from the outset the editorial task was handled by Sweezy and his co-thinker, the left wing popular writer Leo Huberman. The author of an array of books and pamphlets during the 1930s and early 1940s, the New York University-educated Huberman worked full-time on Monthly Review from its establishment until his death of a heart attack in 1968.

Sweezy and Huberman were complementary figures guiding the publication, with Sweezy's theoretical bent and writing ability put to use for a majority of the editorial content, while Huberman took charge of the business and administrative aspects of the enterprise. Sweezy remained at home in New Hampshire, traveling down to New York City once a month to read manuscripts, where Huberman conducted the day-to-day operations of the magazine along with his wife, Gerty Huberman, and family friend Sybil Huntington May.

Briefly joining Sweezy and Huberman as a third founding editor of Monthly Review — although not listed as such on the publication's masthead — was German émigré Otto Nathan (1893-1987). Although his time of editorial association with the magazine was short, Nathan was instrumental in obtaining what would become a seminal essay for the magazine, a lead piece for the debut May 1949 issue by physicist Albert Einstein entitled "Why Socialism?"

Another key contributor during the first 15 years of Monthly Review was economist Paul Baran, frequently considered as the third member of an editorial troika including Sweezy and Huberman. A tenured professor at Stanford University, Baran was one of a very few self-identified Marxists to teach economics at American universities during the Cold War period. Baran worked closely with Sweezy on a book regarded as a landmark in Marxist theory entitled Monopoly Capital, although he died of a heart attack prior to the work's first publication in 1966.

Monthly Review launched in 1949 with a circulation of just 450 copies, most of whom were personal acquaintances of either Huberman or Sweezy. The magazine's ideology and readership closely paralleled that of the independent socialist weekly newspaper The National Guardian, established in 1948. Despite a conservative political climate in the United States, the magazine quickly reached a critical mass of subscribers, with its paid circulation rising to 2,500 in 1950 and to 6,000 in 1954.

McCarthy period
During the era of McCarthyism in the early 1950s, editors Paul Sweezy and Leo Huberman were targeted for "subversive activities". Sweezy's case, tried by New Hampshire Attorney General, reached the Supreme Court and became a seminal case on freedom of speech when the Court ruled in his favor.

In 1953, the Monthly Review added veteran radical Scott Nearing to the magazine's ranks. From that date and for nearly 20 years Nearing authored a column descriptively entitled "World Events". During the Truman and Eisenhower years, many left-wing intellectuals found a space for their work in the magazine, including a number that would gain in stature in the ensuing liberalized decade, such as pacifist activist Staughton Lynd (1952), historian William Appleman Williams (1952), and sociologist C. Wright Mills (1958).

New Left era and after
From the middle years of the 1960s, radical political theory saw a resurgence in association with the emergence of a New Left in Europe and North America. Monthly Review grew in stature in tandem with this resurgence. While remaining an intellectual journal not oriented towards acquiring a mass readership, circulation of the publication nonetheless grew throughout this era, approaching 9,100 in 1970 before peaking at 11,500 in 1977.

While Monthly Review remained essentially a publication with roots in the so-called "Old Left", it was not unsympathetic to the young radical movement which grew in conjunction with the Civil Rights Movement and the opposition to conscription and the Vietnam War. Among those associated with the 1960s New Left published by the Monthly Review were C. Wright Mills, Herbert Marcuse, Todd Gitlin, Carl Oglesby, David Horowitz, and Noam Chomsky.

The Monthly Review editorial staff was joined in May 1969 by radical economist Harry Magdoff, replacing Leo Huberman, who had died in 1968. Magdoff, a reader of the publication from its first issue in 1949, bolstered the already well-developed "Third-Worldist" orientation of the publication, based upon revolutionary events in Cuba, China, and Vietnam. Certain Maoist influence made itself felt in the content of the publication in this period.

Monthly Review became steadily more critical of the Soviet Union in the 1960s and 1970s, with editor Paul Sweezy objecting to the Soviet invasion of Czechoslovakia in 1968 and the suppression of the Polish trade union "Solidarity" through martial law in 1981. In the latter case, Sweezy declared the incident had proved beyond doubt that "the Communist regimes of the Soviet bloc have become the expression and the guardians of a new rigidified hierarchical structure which has nothing in common with the kind of socialist society Marxists have always regarded as the goal of modern working class movements."

Despite an apparent decline of the American Left in the 1980s, Monthly Reviews circulation hovered in the 8,000 range throughout the decade.

Between 1997 and 2000, Monthly Review was co-edited by Ellen Meiksins Wood, Magdoff and Sweezy.

Publication today
Since 2006, John Bellamy Foster has been the publication's editor. Brett Clark is the associate editor, and the magazine also has one assistant editor and an editorial committee.

Uyghur genocide 
In 2020, Monthly Review republished an article from the Qiao Collective, a Chinese media platform aimed at "challenging U.S. aggression towards China." In response, a group of international scholars signed an open letter to Monthly Review condemning the article for being dismissive of China's crackdown on Uyghur Muslim minorities in the Xinjiang region. The letter accused the article of "agnosticism, let alone denialism, towards what is clearly a shocking infringement of the rights of Uyghur people." The lead author of the letter was David Brophy, a historian of China at the University of Sydney. Darren Byler, an expert on Xinjiang and one of the signatories, said he hoped the letter would make it "difficult for leftist 'scholar-activists' to continue to promote Xinjiang-related disinformation."

Political orientation

From its first issue, Monthly Review attacked the premise that capitalism was capable of infinite growth through Keynesian macroeconomic fine-tuning. Instead, the magazine's editors and leading writers have remained true to the traditional Marxist perspective that capitalist economies contain internal contradictions which will ultimately lead to their collapse and reconstitution on a new socialist basis. Topics of editorial concern have included poverty, unequal distribution of incomes and wealth.

Although not averse to discussion of esoteric matters of socialist theory, Monthly Review was generally characterized by an aversion to doctrinaire citations of Marxist canon in favor of the analysis of real-world economic and historical trends. Readability was emphasized and the use of academic jargon discouraged.

Editors Huberman and Sweezy argued as early as 1952 that massive and expanding military spending was an integral part of the process of capitalist stabilization, driving corporate profits, bolstering levels of employment, and absorbing surplus production. They argued the illusion of an external military threat was required to sustain this system of priorities in government spending; consequently, effort was made by the editors to challenge the dominant Cold War paradigm of "Democracy versus Communism" in the material published in the magazine.

In its editorial line Monthly Review offered critical support of the Soviet Union during its early years although over time the magazine became increasingly critical of Soviet dedication to Socialism in one country and peaceful coexistence, seeing that country as playing a more or less conservative role in a world marked by national revolutionary movements. After the Sino-Soviet split of the 1960s, Sweezy and Huberman soon came to see the People's Republic of China as the actual center of the world revolutionary movement.

Monthly Review never aligned with any specific revolutionary movement or political organization. Many of its articles have been written by academics, journalists, and freelance public intellectuals, including Albert Einstein, Tariq Ali, Isabel Allende, Samir Amin, Julian Bond, Marilyn Buck, G. D. H. Cole, Bernardine Dohrn, W. E. B. Du Bois, Barbara Ehrenreich, Andre Gunder Frank, Eduardo Galeano, Che Guevara, Lorraine Hansberry, Edward S. Herman, Eric Hobsbawm, Michael Klare, Saul Landau, Michael Parenti, Robert W. McChesney, Ralph Miliband, Marge Piercy, Frances Fox Piven, Adrienne Rich, Jean-Paul Sartre, Daniel Singer, E. P. Thompson, Immanuel Wallerstein, and Raymond Williams.

In 2004, Monthly Review editor John Bellamy Foster told The New York Times: "The Monthly Review... was and is Marxist, but did not hew to the party line or get into sectarian struggles."

Non-English editions
In addition to the U.S.-based magazine, there are seven sister editions of Monthly Review. They are published in Greece; Turkey; Spain; South Korea; as well as separate English, Hindi, and Bengali editions in India.

Monthly Review Press
Monthly Review Press, an allied endeavor, was launched in 1951 in response to the inability of the maverick left-wing journalist I. F. Stone to otherwise find a publisher for his book The Hidden History of the Korean War. Stone's work, which argued that the still ongoing Korean War was not a case of simple Communist military aggression but was rather the product of political isolation, South Korean military buildup, and border provocations, became the first title offered by the affiliated publisher in 1952. 

Harry Braverman (author of Labor and Monopoly Capital) became director of Monthly Review Press in 1967. The present director of the Press is Michael D. Yates (author of Naming the System). Monthly Review Press is also the U.S. publisher of The Socialist Register, an annual British publication since 1964, which contains topical essays written by radical academics and activists as was coedited in part by the late Leo Panitch.

Titles published by the press in its formative years include We, the People: The Drama of America by Leo Huberman (1932), The Empire of Oil by Harvey O'Connor (1955), The Political Economy of Growth by Paul Baran (1957), Consciencism: Philosophy and Ideology for Decolonization and Development with Particular Reference to the African Revolution by Kwame Nkrumah (1959),  Caste, Class and Race by Oliver Cromwell Cox (1948/1959), Capitalism and Underdevelopment in Latin America: Historical Studies of Chile and Brazil by Andre Gunder Frank (1962), The United States, Cuba, and Castro by William Appleman Williams (1963), Anarchism by Daniel Guerin (1965), Fanshen: A Documentary of Revolution in a Chinese Village by William Hinton (1966), Monopoly Capital by Paul A. Baran and Paul M. Sweezy (1966), Revolution and Evolution in the Twentieth Century by James Boggs and Grace Lee Boggs (1969), The National Question: Selected Writings by Rosa Luxemburg (1971), The Poverty of Theory and Other Essays by E. P. Thompson (1973), the English translation of Open Veins of Latin America by Eduardo Galeano (1973), Puerto Rican Obituary by Pedro Pietri (1973), Unity and Struggle: Speeches and Writings of Amilcar Cabral (1974), Spiks, by Pedro Juan Soto (1974), Unequal Development by Samir Amin (1976), The Arabs in Israel by Sabri Jiryis (1976), On Education: Articles on Educational Theory and Pedagogy, and Writings for Children from “The Age of Gold” by Jose Martí and edited by Eric Foner (1979), The ‘Dictatorship of the Proletariat’ from Marx to Lenin by Hal Draper (1982), The Poor and the Powerless: Economic Policy and Change in the Caribbean by Clive Y. Thomas, Columbus: His Enterprise: Exploding the Myth by Hans Koning (1987) and Eurocentrism (1989) by Samir Amin.

In later years, Monthly Review Press has published such titles as Discourse on Colonialism by Aimé Césaire (1995), Reminiscences of the Cuban Revolutionary War by Che Guevara (1994), Haiti: State Against Nation by Michel-Rolph Trouillot (1996), The Problem of the Media: U.S. Communication Politics in the Twenty-First Century by Robert W. McChesney (2000), Toward an Open Tomb: The Crisis of Israeli Society by Michel Warschawski (2000), Biology under the Influence by Richard Lewontin and Richard Levins (2007), Walter A. Rodney: A Promise of Revolution by Clairmont Chung (2008), The Great Financial Crisis by Fred Magdoff and John Bellamy Foster (2009), America’s Education Deficit and the War on Youth by Henry A. Giroux (2013), Big Farms Make Big Flu: Dispatches on Infectious Disease, Agribusiness, and the Nature of Science by Rob Wallace (2016), Fighting Two Colonialisms: Women in Guinea-Bissau by Stephanie J. Urdang (1975/2017), The Dawning of the Apocalypse: The Roots of Slavery, White Supremacy, Settler Colonialism, and Capitalism in the Long Sixteenth Century by Gerald Horne (2020), as well as Marx's Ecology, The Return of Nature and other titles by Monthly Review Magazine editor John Bellamy Foster.

MRzine
From 2005 to 2016, Monthly Review published an associated website, MRzine. At its closure, Monthly Review announced that it would maintain an online archive of the site.

Abstracting and indexing 
According to the Journal Citation Reports, the journal has a 2014 impact factor of 0.460, ranking it 107th out of 161 journals in the category "Political Science".

Editors
Monthly Review Magazine has had six editors listed on its masthead:
 Paul Sweezy, from 1949 to his death in 2004
 Leo Huberman from 1949 to his death in 1968
 Harry Magdoff from 1969 to his death in 2006
 Ellen Meiksins Wood, 1997–2000
 Robert W. McChesney, 2000–2004
 John Bellamy Foster, May 2000–present
Harry Braverman became director of Monthly Review Press in 1967, and the present director of the Press is Michael D. Yates.

Footnotes

Further reading
 Paul A. Baran, The Longer View. New York: Monthly Review Press, 1969.
 Stephen Resnick and Richard Wolff, Rethinking Marxism: Essays for Harry Madgoff and Paul Sweezy. Brooklyn, NY: Audomedia, 1985.
 
 "From the Left: Harry Magdoff; A Free-Market Failure," New York Times, November 1, 1987.
 Robert W. McChesney, "The Monthly Review Story: 1949-1984," MRzine, June 5, 2007.

External links

 
 Monthly Review Press: publishing house and catalog
 Monthly Review Press titles still in print
 Monthly Review Archives
Political magazines published in the United States
Monthly magazines published in the United States
English-language magazines
Alternative magazines
Magazines established in 1949
Socialist magazines
Marxist magazines
Socialism in the United States
Anti-consumerist groups
Magazines published in New York City
1949 establishments in New York (state)